Film Encores is an album by Mantovani and His Orchestra. It was released in 1957 by London (catalog no. LL-1700). It debuted on Billboard magazine's pop album chart on May 27, 1957, peaked at the No. 1 spot, and remained on the chart for 113 weeks. It was an RIAA certified gold album (minimum 500,000 units sold). AllMusic later gave the album a rating of three stars.

Track listing
Side A
 "My Foolish Heart"
 "Unchained Melody"
 "Over the Rainbow"
 "Summertime in Venice"
 "Intermezzo"
 "Three Coins in the Fountain"

Side B
 "Love Is a Many Splendored Thing"
 "Laura"
 "High Noon"
 "Hi-Lili, Hi-Lo"
 "September Song"
 Theme from "Limelight"

References

1957 albums
London Records albums
Mantovani albums